Scilliroside is a toxic  compound derived from the plant Drimia maritima (syn. Urginea maritima), which is sometimes used as a rodenticide.

References 

Rodenticides
Bufanolides
Alcohols
Acetate esters